Lyubomir Genchev (Bulgarian: Любомир Генчев; born 13 April 1986) is a Bulgarian professional footballer who plays as a midfielder. He is son of former footballer Boncho Genchev.

Career
Genchev returned to Lokomotiv Gorna Oryahovitsa for the 2016–17 season but was released in September 2017.

References

External links

Genchev Statistics with Hendon
Genchev Statistics with Lowestoft Town

1986 births
Living people
People from Veliko Tarnovo
Association football midfielders
Association football wingers
Bulgarian footballers
Regionalliga players
Isthmian League players
First Professional Football League (Bulgaria) players
Second Professional Football League (Bulgaria) players
1. FC Union Berlin players
Neftochimic Burgas players
Hendon F.C. players
Lowestoft Town F.C. players
FC Lyubimets players
FC Lokomotiv Gorna Oryahovitsa players
FC Montana players
SFC Etar Veliko Tarnovo players
Bulgarian expatriate footballers
Bulgarian expatriate sportspeople in Germany
Bulgarian expatriate sportspeople in England
Expatriate footballers in Germany
Expatriate footballers in England
Sportspeople from Veliko Tarnovo Province